This is a list of cities and towns in Poland, consisting of four sections: the full list of all 107 cities in Poland by size, followed by a description of the principal metropolitan areas of the country, the table of the most populated cities and towns in Poland, and finally, the full alphabetical list of all 107 Polish cities and 861 towns combined. 

As of 30 April 2022, there are altogether 2477 municipalities (gmina) in Poland:
 1513 of them are rural gminas containing exclusively rural areas, each of them forms a part of one of the 314 regular powiats, but never as its seat,
 the remaining 968 ones contain a locality classified either as a city or a town, among them:
 666 towns are managed together with their rural surroundings under a single local government in the form of an eponymous urban-rural gmina typically seated in such town (though not always; currently, Gmina Nowe Skalmierzyce is the only urban-rural gmina seated elsewhere than in the town); such mixed municipalities always form part of a regular powiat, sometimes seated in such town, in such case being usually an eponymous one (though there are some exceptions; e.g. Warsaw West County is seated in the town Ożarów Mazowiecki while Gdańsk County is seated in the town Pruszcz Gdański, although their names would suggest otherwise; in addition, two binominal ″hyphen″ counties seated in such towns have been named so due to long-established animosity between a pair of towns similar in size, in order to placate both competing populations, namely Strzelce-Drezdenko County and Ropczyce-Sędziszów County; finally, the mountainuous Bieszczady County has been named after the mountain range rather than its seat)
 302 cities and towns are standalone as an urban gmina; nevertheless some of them be also a seat of an eponymous rural gmina surrounding it (the latter thus being often doughnut-shaped), despite not being a part of its territory; 
 195 standalone towns, each of them forming a part of a regular powiat and sometimes being its seat, in the latter case usually an eponymous one, though there are three exceptions (two of them are binominal ″hyphen″ counties, with Czarnków-Trzcianka County named so due to a long-established animosity between a pair of towns similar in size, while Bieruń-Lędziny County acquired its name when the decision was taken to have its seat relocated from its original location in Tychy, a city with powiat rights, to one of these two conpeting towns; the third exception is the mountainuous Tatra County named after the mountain range rather than its seat)
 107 cities (governed by a city mayor or prezydent miasta), among them:
 41 cities form along with two or more other municipalities an eponymous regular powiat, seated always in the city
 66 cities hold status of a city with powiat rights (an independent city) which is an urban gmina operating also as a powiat in its own right within a voivodeship; nevertheless, it may be also a seat of a regular powiat, in such case usually an eponymous one (with two exceptions, namely the Łódź East County bearing the additional designation East because of bordering the city only to the west, as well as the mountainuous Karkonosze County seated in Jelenia Góra but named after the mountain range rather than its seat) despite not being included in the territory of the county (the latter thus being often doughnut-shaped)
 37 cities are over 100,000, including 
 18 cities which serve as a seat for voivode or the voivodeship sejmik, thus being  informally called voivodeship cities or capitals (in spite of only 16 voivodeships existing in Poland; the discrepancy is caused by the fact that both institutions are seated in a single capital city in only 14 of the 16 voivodeships, while in each of the remaining two they are divided equally between a pair of capital cities), 
 11 of them are seats of an appeal court and other supra-voivodeship institutions,
 They include the capital city of the country, the only Polish city with population exceeding 1,000,000, and the only one governed by a dedicated act of Parliament.
 
In some cases, a city with powiat rights may also be a seat of both an eponymous rural gmina and an eponymous regular powiat, despite belonging to neither, e.g. Siedlce, Skierniewice, Słupsk. No city in Poland constitutes a separate voivodeship in its own right, though 5 cities held such status in the past.

General principles
All municipalities in Poland are governed regardless of their type under the mandatory mayor–council government system. Executive power in a rural gmina is exercised by a wójt, while the homologue in municipalities containing cities or towns is called accordingly either a city mayor (prezydent miasta) or a town mayor (burmistrz), all of them elected by a two-round direct election, while the town/city council is the legislative, budget-making and oversight body. Any local laws considered non-compliant with the national ones may be invalidated by the respective voivode, whose rulings may be appealed to an administrative court. Decisions in individual cases may in turn be appealed to quasi-judicial bodies named , their ruling subject to appeal to an administrative court. A town or city mayor may be scrutinized  or denied funding for his/her projects by the council, but is not politically responsible to it and does not require its confidence to remain in office; therefore, cohabitation is not uncommon. A recall referendum may however be triggered either in respect to the wójt/town mayor/city mayor or to the municipal council through a petition supported by at least 1/10 of eligible voters, but the turnout in the recall referendum must be at least 3/5 of the number of people voting in the original election in order for the referendum to be valid and binding. In addition, elected bodies of any municipality may be suspended by the Prime Minister of Poland in case of persisting law transgressions or negligence, resulting in such case in the municipality being placed under receivership. In a city with powiat rights, the city mayor additionally has the powers and duties of a powiat executive board and a starosta, while the city council has the powers and duties of a powiat (county) council; both nevertheless being elected under the municipal election rules rather than those applicable to county elections.

Cities
In spite of no linguistic distinction between a city and a town in the Polish language (both translated ), a city may be recognized among other Polish urban municipalities through being managed by a city mayor (literally translated city president) instead of a town mayor as the head of the city executive, thus being informally called miasto prezydenckie, with such privilege automatically awarded to municipalities either inhabited by more than 100,000 residents (currently 37) or those enjoying the status of a city with powiat rights (currently 66). As of 2022, all of the former group fit into the latter, though it was not always the case in the past. There is, however, a number of exemptions due to historic or political reasons, when a municipality meets neither of these two conditions but nevertheless has the city status, including the only 3 capitals of the former voivodeships of Poland (1975–1998) not meeting the abovementioned criteria, as well as 38 other municipalities which do not fit into any of the mentioned categories but have nevertheless been allowed to keep the earlier awarded status due to unspecified historical reasons. Among the 37 cities over 100,000, 18 are seats of voivode or voivodeship sejmik, thus carrying the informal designation of a voivodeship city. 11 of them are seats of an appeal court and other supra-voivodeship institutions.

The 107 Polish cities belong to the following size ranges in terms of the number of inhabitants (cites with powiat rights are indicated with italics; the seats of either a voivode or a voivodeship legislature are marked in bold, the seats of an appeal court are marked with an asterisk*):
 1 city larger than 1,000,000: Warsaw*
 4 cities from 500,000 to 1,000,000: Kraków*, Łódź*, Wrocław*, Poznań*
 6 cities from 250,000 to 500,000: Gdańsk*, Szczecin*, Bydgoszcz, Lublin*, Białystok*, Katowice*
 26 cities from 100,000 to 250,000: Gdynia, Częstochowa, Radom, Rzeszów*, Toruń, Sosnowiec, Kielce, Gliwice, Olsztyn, Zabrze, Bielsko-Biała, Bytom, Zielona Góra, Rybnik, Ruda Śląska, Opole, Tychy, Gorzów Wielkopolski, Elbląg, Płock, Dąbrowa Górnicza, Wałbrzych, Włocławek, Tarnów, Chorzów, Koszalin
 45 cities from 50,000 to 100,000: Kalisz, Legnica, Grudziądz, Jaworzno, Słupsk, Jastrzębie-Zdrój, Nowy Sącz, Jelenia Góra, Siedlce, Mysłowice, Konin, Piła, Piotrków Trybunalski, Inowrocław, Lubin, Ostrów Wielkopolski, Suwałki, Stargard, Gniezno, Ostrowiec Świętokrzyski, Siemianowice Śląskie, Głogów, Pabianice, Leszno, Żory, Zamość, Pruszków, Łomża, Ełk, Tomaszów Mazowiecki, Chełm, Mielec, Kędzierzyn-Koźle, Przemyśl, Stalowa Wola, Tczew, Biała Podlaska, Bełchatów, Świdnica, Będzin, Zgierz, Piekary Śląskie, Racibórz, Legionowo, Ostrołęka
 25 cities from 35,000 to 50,000: Świętochłowice, Wejherowo, Zawiercie, Skierniewice, Starachowice, Wodzisław Śląski, Starogard Gdański, Puławy, Tarnobrzeg, Kołobrzeg, Krosno, Radomsko, Otwock, Skarżysko-Kamienna, Ciechanów, Kutno, Sieradz, Zduńska Wola, Świnoujście, Żyrardów, Bolesławiec, Nowa Sól, Knurów, Oświęcim, and Sopot.

The biggest towns (e.g. Tarnowskie Góry, Rumia, Piaseczno) are larger than a number of cities.

Principal metropolitan areas
Only a single officially incorporated multi-purpose metropolitan union exists in Poland, the sui generis Metropolis GZM, established by a dedicated act of Parliament of Poland within the Silesian Voivodeship, currently composed of 41 contiguous municipalities, with some of them containing also rural areas. Its total population is 2,279,560. The metropolis is a part of the wider Katowice urban area within the transnational Upper Silesian metropolitan area.

A de facto metropolitan area is, however, also formed in some aspects by the capital city of Warsaw, a city with powiat rights, and the 9 neighbouring counties: Warsaw West County, Nowy Dwór County, Legionowo County, Wołomin County, Mińsk County, Otwock County, Piaseczno County, Pruszków County and Grodzisk Mazowiecki County. Warsaw forms together with these counties a NUTS 2 area separate as an exception from the remainder of its home region, the Mazovian Voivodeship. In addition, identical area is policed by the Capital City Police Headquarters separate from the Mazovian Voivodeship Police Headquarters, with a status equal to that of voivodeship police headquarters. Attempts to establish a formally incorporated metropolitan union have been fiercely resisted by the citizens and the city mayor of Warsaw who have considered them a form of concealed gerrymandering, potentially leading to a political takeover of the city government through aiming to counterbalance the profoundly liberal city population with the conservative population of the neighbouring areas. 

A third widely known metropolitan area is the Tricity in Pomeranian Voivodeship, consisting of the eponymous cities of Gdańsk, Sopot and Gdynia. The designation has been used informally or semi-formally only. A strategic cooperation declaration, the Tricity Charter (Polish: Karta Trójmiasta), was signed by the three city mayors on 28 March 2007. The only incorporated common management authority in the Tricity metro is the Gdańsk Bay Public Transport Metropolitan Union which is, despite the name, an inter-municipal union and not a metropolitan one.

Largest cities and towns by population 
Poland contains:
 1 city over 1,000,000
 4 cities from 500,000 to 999,999:
 6 cities from 250,000 to 499,999:
 26 cities from 100,000 to 249,999:
 45 cities and 1 town from 50,000 to 99,999
 25 cities and 69 towns from 25,000 to 49,999
 221 towns from 10,000 do 24,999
 187 towns from 5,000 to 9,999
 220 towns from 2,500 to 4,999
 140 towns from 1,000 to 2,499
 9 towns below 1,000.

Below is the table of the most populated cities and towns in Poland. The table ranks cities by population based on data from the Central Statistical Office of Poland.

Cities and towns alphabetically

A

B

Ba-Be

Bi-Bl

Bo-Br

Bu-By

C

Ce-Ch

Ci-Cz

Ć
Ćmielów

D

Da-Do

Dr-Dz

E
Elbląg
Ełk

F
Frampol
Frombork

G

Ga-Gn

Go - Gó

Gr-Gu

H
Hajnówka
Halinów
Hel
Hrubieszów

I

J

K

Ka-Kc

Ke-Kn

Ko

Kr-Kw

L

La-Li

Lu-Lw

Ł

M

Ma

Mi

Mo-My

N

Na-Ni

No-Ny

O

Ob-Or

Os-Oz

P

Pa-Pe

Pi-Pl

Pn-Po

Pr-Py

R

Ra

Re-Rz

S

Sa-Si

Sk-Sl

So

St

Su-Sy

Sz

Ś

T

U

W

Wa-Wę

Wi-Wł

Wo-Wy

Z

Ż

Footnotes

See also 
 List of former towns of Poland
 List of Polish cities and towns damaged in World War II
 List of places which obtained/regained town status in the years since 1900: Nadania praw miejskich w Polsce po 1900 (Polish Wikipedia)

External links 
Central Statistical Office of Poland
City Population: Poland (statistics & map)

List of official names of localities and their parts

Poland
Poland
 
Cities
Poland